Energy in Algeria describes energy and electricity production, consumption and import in Algeria. Primary energy use in 2009 in Algeria was 462 TWh and 13 TWh per million persons. Algeria is an OPEC country.

Overview

Natural gas

Algeria was top 5. exporter of  natural gas in 2009  with 55 billion cubic metres (bcm) net export behind 1) Russia 169 bcm, 2) Norway 100 bcm, 3) Canada 76 bcm and 4) Qatar 67 bcm.

Top natural gas producers in 2009 were: 1) USA 594 bcm, 2) Russia 589 bcm, 3) Canada 159 bcm, Iran 144 bcm, 4) Norway 106 bcm, 5) China 90 bcm, 6) Qatar 89 bcm, and  7) Algeria 81 bcm.

Gas Pipelines
The Trans-Mediterranean Pipeline (TransMed) is a natural gas pipeline from Algeria via Tunisia to Sicily and Italy constructed in 1978-1983 and 1991-1994.

The Maghreb–Europe Gas Pipeline is 1,620 kilometres long natural gas pipeline from Algeria via Morocco to Spain.

The Medgaz Pipeline is a natural gas pipeline from Algeria to Spain.

Nuclear Energy 
Since 1995 Algeria operates research reactors at Draria and Aïn Oussera. It signed nuclear cooperation agreements with Russia in January 2007, with the United States in June 2007, and with China in March 2008. Algeria has discussed nuclear cooperation also with France.

Oil 
Algeria is a member of OPEC. In 2008 Algeria was the top 7th oil products exporter. Less than 11% of worlds oil products were exported. Total world crude oil export was 1 952 Mt and oil products export 411 Mt in 2008.

Oil fields include Hassi Messaoud oil field, Ourhoud Oil Field and Rhourde El Baguel oil field. As of 2022, Algeria produces roughly a million barrels of crude per day.

Solar power 

Algeria has the highest technical and economical potential for solar power exploitation in the MENA region, with about 170 TWh per year. First industrial scale solar thermal power project has been initiated by inauguration of Hassi R'Mel power station in 2011. This new hybrid power plant combines a 25-megawatt (MW) concentrating solar power array in conjunction with a 130 MW combined cycle gas turbine plant.

In addition, Algeria has launched in 2011 a national program to develop renewable energy based on photovoltaics (PV), concentrated solar power (CSP) and wind power, and to promote energy efficiency. The program consists of installing up to 12 GW of power generating capacity from renewable sources to meet the domestic electricity demand by 2030.

See also

 Oil megaprojects (2011)

References